John Dougall (born April 2, 1966) is an American politician from the state of Utah who has been serving as the Utah State Auditor . A member of the Republican Party, he previously served as a Utah State Representative from 2003 to 2013. Dougall assumed office during the 55th legislative session, replacing David Litvack. Dougall has received bipartisan praise for his accomplishments as state auditor.

Early life and education
Dougall was born in Hollywood and raised in Portland, Oregon. He graduated from Brigham Young University in 1990 with a Bachelor of Science in electrical engineering, and he earned his Master of Science in electrical engineering from BYU the following year. He earned his MBA from BYU in 2000.

Dougall has worked at various technology companies in Silicon Valley.

Political career
Dougall was first elected to the Utah House of Representatives in 2002, winning against a crowded field of Republican Party primary opponents. During his 10-year tenure in the House, he sponsored various bills related to transportation, government transparency, and tax reform, including tax cuts in 2006 under governor Jon Huntsman. He also sponsored the controversial HB477, which would have amended the Government Records Access and Management Act to increase restrictions on public access to government documents. The bill was signed into law in March 2011 by governor Gary Herbert, but it was repealed two weeks later after public backlash and harsh criticism from The Salt Lake Tribune. Despite this, Dougall has generally been regarded as an advocate for transparency in the Utah state government.

Dougall was elected Utah State Auditor in 2012, defeating fellow Republican incumbent Auston Johnson. As state auditor, Dougall has led audits that have revealed mismanagement and unethical or illegal behavior at various levels of government in Utah, and some of his investigations have targeted members of his own party. For these actions, he has earned bipartisan praise as state auditor.

Dougall briefly considered challenging Mitt Romney in the Republican primary for U.S. Senate in 2018, but ultimately decided against it.

In 2020, it was announced that Dougall would be running for Lieutenant Governor of Utah as Aimee Winder Newton's running mate.

References

External links
 Office of the Utah State Auditor
Project Vote Smart – John Dougall (UT) profile
Our Campaigns – John Dougall (UT) profile
John Dougall at Ballotpedia

|-

1966 births
Living people
Republican Party members of the Utah House of Representatives
Politicians from Los Angeles
Politicians from Portland, Oregon
Electrical engineers